Dumitru Marian Berbece (born 2 January 1961) is a Romanian handball coach and former player. Competing at two Olympics and four world championships he won bronze medals at the 1984 Olympics and 1990 World Championships. At the club level he played for Steaua Bucharest, Alzira Valencia and SG Leutershausen in Germany.

References

External links 
 
 
 

1961 births
Living people
Romanian male handball players
People from Bacău County
CSA Steaua București (handball) players
Handball players at the 1984 Summer Olympics
Handball players at the 1992 Summer Olympics
Olympic handball players of Romania
Olympic bronze medalists for Romania
Olympic medalists in handball
Medalists at the 1984 Summer Olympics